The 2012 season was the Denver Broncos' 43rd in the National Football League (NFL), their 53rd overall and their second under head coach John Fox. The offseason was marked by the signing of former Indianapolis Colts' quarterback Peyton Manning on March 20, leading to the team trading incumbent quarterback Tim Tebow to the New York Jets. The Broncos did not have a first-round selection in the 2012 NFL Draft, and selected defensive end Derek Wolfe as the team's first pick in the second round of the draft.

After a 2–3 start to the season, the Broncos finished the regular season on an eleven-game winning streak, and with a record of 13–3, the team exceeded their win total from the previous two seasons combined. The Broncos won their second consecutive AFC West division title, as well as earning a first-round bye for the first time since 2005 and homefield advantage throughout the playoffs, but lost to the eventual Super Bowl champion Baltimore Ravens in the Divisional round by a double-overtime score of 38–35.

During the season, Manning set numerous individual, franchise and league records, including 300-yard passing games and game-winning drives in the fourth quarter or overtime. Second-year linebacker Von Miller also set a franchise record for sacks at 18.5.

Coaching and front-office changes
 January 17: Matt Russell, who served as the team's director of college scouting during the past three seasons, was promoted to director of player personnel. That same day, the Broncos announced that Rich Tuten, the team's strength and conditioning coach since 1995, will not return for the 2012 season.
 January 24: Defensive coordinator Dennis Allen was hired as the new head coach of the Oakland Raiders.
 January 27: The Broncos hired former Jacksonville Jaguars' head coach Jack Del Rio as the team's new defensive coordinator, replacing Dennis Allen. Also on January 27, the Broncos hired Luke Richesson as the team's new strength and conditioning coach, replacing Rich Tuten.
 February 3: The Broncos hired Mike Sullivan as the team's new director of football administration, replacing Mike Bluem.
 May 7: The Broncos parted ways with general manager Brian Xanders after four seasons. The team never did announce a replacement.
 May 14: Wayne Nunnely, who served as the team's defensive line coach during the past three seasons, retired. His position was filled by Jay Rodgers, who served as a coaching assistant during the past three seasons.
 May 29: Cory Undlin was hired as the new defensive quality control coach – a position previously held by Jay Rodgers. Undlin previously worked on Jack Del Rio's staff with the Jacksonville Jaguars for the previous three seasons.

Roster changes

Free agents

Signings

Signing of Peyton Manning
On March 20, 2012, the Broncos reached an agreement with former Indianapolis Colts' quarterback Peyton Manning on a five-year, $96 million contract. Manning missed the entire  season following multiple neck surgeries, and was released by the Colts two weeks earlier on March 7, one day before the Colts were due to pay him a $28 million roster bonus. The Seattle Seahawks, Arizona Cardinals, Miami Dolphins, San Francisco 49ers and Tennessee Titans were also mentioned as possible destinations for the former long-time Colts quarterback; however, Manning informed Broncos' personnel to begin contract negotiations with the team on March 19, and he was introduced as the Broncos' new quarterback in a press conference at the team's headquarters in Dove Valley the following day.

The language of the contract contained the following conditions: Manning did not suffer a setback in his recovery from neck surgery prior to the end of the  season; therefore, the Broncos owed Manning $18 million for the 2012 season. Manning passed a physical exam at the beginning of the  league year, and the Broncos owed Manning $40 million through the  season. The fourth (and eventual final) year of the contract – $19 million for  – was dependent on Manning passing a physical exam. Manning retired on March 7, 2016, one month after the Broncos won Super Bowl 50.

Departures

Trades
 On March 21, one day after the signing of Peyton Manning, the Broncos were involved in a trade that sent quarterback Tim Tebow to the New York Jets – see draft section below.
 On May 23, cornerback Cassius Vaughn was traded to the Indianapolis Colts in exchange for fullback Chris Gronkowski.

Draft

Draft trades

Undrafted free agents
All undrafted free agents were signed just after the 2012 NFL draft concluded on April 28, unless noted otherwise.

Suspensions

 March 9: Linebacker D. J. Williams, defensive tackle Ryan McBean and tight end Virgil Green were each suspended by the NFL for violating the league's policy on performance-enhancing substances. Williams and McBean were each suspended for the first six games of the  season, while Green was given a four-game suspension. Williams and McBean each challenged the suspensions and took legal action against the NFL. McBean later  signed with the Baltimore Ravens on May 7, three weeks after his restricted free agent tender was rescinded by the Broncos. On August 27, a federal appeals court upheld Williams' suspension, and on October 5, Williams was suspended for an additional three games by the NFL following his August conviction for a driving under the influence arrest in November 2010. Green was reinstated to the active roster on October 1, while Williams was reinstated to the active roster on November 17, the latter in time for the team's Week 11 game vs. the San Diego Chargers.
 September 25: Linebacker Joe Mays was suspended one game and fined $50,000 by the NFL for a helmet-to-helmet hit on Houston Texans' quarterback Matt Schaub, during the Broncos' 31–25 loss to the Texans two days earlier (September 23). Schaub had his helmet knocked off, and suffered a laceration on his earlobe as a result of the hit. Mays missed the Broncos' Week 4 game against the Oakland Raiders, and had been considered a repeat offender, following a $7,875 fine for a hit on Atlanta Falcons' quarterback Matt Ryan in Week 2.

Injuries
 August 4: Running back Mario Fannin suffered a ruptured Achilles tendon during training camp, and was placed on injured reserve. Fannin missed the entire  season following a knee injury during the preseason last year.
 August 14: Guard Chris Kuper suffered a broken forearm during practice. He not only missed the remainder of the preseason, but also missed the first five games of the regular season. Also on August 14, defensive end Jason Hunter suffered torn triceps, and was initially expected to miss at least two months, but was placed on injured reserve on August 27.
 September 11: Defensive tackle Ty Warren was placed on injured reserve, after suffering torn triceps for a second consecutive season.
 September 18: Rookie guard/center Philip Blake was placed on injured reserve.
 September 29: Safety Quinton Carter was placed on injured reserve due to knee surgery.
 October 1: Center J. D. Walton was placed on injured reserve, after suffering a dislocated ankle during the team's Week 4 win over the Oakland Raiders the previous day.
 October 30: Linebacker Joe Mays was placed on injured reserve, after he suffered a fractured fibula during the team's Week 8 win over the New Orleans Saints two days earlier.
 November 21: Running back Willis McGahee was placed on the injured reserve/designated for return list, two days after suffering a ruptured MCL and compression fracture in his right knee, during the team's Week 11 win over the San Diego Chargers. Under NFL rules, McGahee became eligible to return to practice on January 2, 2013 – three days after the regular season finale, and would have been eligible to return for the AFC championship game on January 20, had the Broncos made it that far into the postseason.
 Cornerback Tracy Porter missed more than half of the season, after experiencing aftereffects from a seizure that he suffered during the preseason. Porter began experiencing symptoms prior to the team's Week 6 game against the San Diego Chargers, and returned to practice on a limited basis over the next several weeks. Porter returned to game action against the Cleveland Browns in Week 16, only to suffer a concussion and miss the Week 17 regular season finale and the playoffs.

Staff

Final roster

Preseason

Regular season

Schedule

Note: Intra-division opponents are in bold text.

Game summaries

Week 1: vs. Pittsburgh Steelers

The Broncos kicked off their  season at home against the Pittsburgh Steelers on Sunday Night Football, in a rematch of their 2011 Wild Card playoff game. After a scoreless first quarter, the Steelers grabbed the lead, with a 21-yard field goal by placekicker Shaun Suisham. The Broncos responded, with running back Knowshon Moreno rushing for a 7-yard touchdown, but the Steelers countered, with a 4-yard touchdown pass from quarterback Ben Roethlisberger to tight end Heath Miller just before halftime. In the third quarter, the Steelers added to their lead, with a 35-yard field goal by Suisham. The Broncos grabbed the lead, when quarterback Peyton Manning threw his 400th career touchdown pass—a 71-yarder to wide receiver Demaryius Thomas, but the Steelers responded early in the fourth quarter, when Roethlisberger threw a 3-yard touchdown pass to wide receiver Mike Wallace (with a failed two-point conversion attempt). With 9:23 remaining in the fourth quarter, the Broncos claimed the lead for good, when Manning threw a 1-yard touchdown pass to tight end Jacob Tamme (coupled with running back Willis McGahee receiving a pass from Manning for a two-point conversion), then added to their lead with a 26-yard field goal by placekicker Matt Prater, followed by cornerback Tracy Porter returning an interception off Roethlisberger 43 yards for a touchdown (with a failed two-point conversion attempt).

Week 2: at Atlanta Falcons

Following their season-opening win over the Steelers, the Broncos traveled to the Georgia Dome to face the Atlanta Falcons on Monday Night Football. The Falcons converted three Broncos' turnovers into a 20–0 lead, with a 1-yard touchdown run by running back Michael Turner, followed by field goals of 37 and 42 yards by placekicker Matt Bryant—the latter in the second quarter—and a 1-yard touchdown pass from quarterback Matt Ryan to tight end Tony Gonzalez. The Broncos got on the scoreboard just before halftime, with quarterback Peyton Manning throwing a 17-yard touchdown pass to wide receiver Demaryius Thomas. The Falcons responded in the third quarter, with a 4-yard touchdown pass from Ryan to wide receiver Roddy White. The Broncos tried to rally in the fourth quarter, with running back Willis McGahee rushing for a pair of 2-yard touchdowns. However, the Falcons would run out the clock.

Week 3: vs. Houston Texans

Hoping to rebound from their Monday Night loss in Atlanta, the Broncos returned home for an AFC duel with the Houston Texans. The Broncos jumped out to a 5–0 lead in the first quarter, with defensive end Elvis Dumervil sacking Texans' quarterback Matt Schaub in the end zone for a safety, followed by a 32-yard field goal placekicker Matt Prater. However, the Texans would reel off 21 unanswered points, with Schaub throwing three touchdown passes—a 60-yarder to wide receiver Andre Johnson, followed in the second quarter by a 3-yarder to running back Arian Foster and a 52-yarder to wide receiver Kevin Walter. The Broncos narrowed the Texans' lead to 21–11 at halftime, with a pair of field goals by Prater—from 23 and 53 yards. The Texans increased their lead in the third quarter, with a 41-yard field goal by placekicker Shayne Graham, followed by a 14-yard touchdown pass from Schaub to tight end Owen Daniels. Trailing 31–11 with 10:20 remaining in the fourth quarter, the Broncos tried to rally, with quarterback Peyton Manning throwing a pair of touchdown passes—a 38-yarder to wide receiver Brandon Stokley and a 6-yarder to tight end Joel Dreessen to narrow Houston's lead to 31–25 with three minutes remaining. After forcing a Texans' punt, the Broncos got the football back with 20 seconds remaining, but the Texans' defense stood their ground.

Notes

Former wide receiver Rod Smith, who played with the Broncos from 1994 to 2007, was inducted into the Broncos Ring of Fame during halftime. Smith is the Broncos' franchise leader in receptions, receiving yards and touchdowns.

Week 4: vs. Oakland Raiders

Hoping to snap a two-game losing streak, the Broncos remained on home ground for an AFC West duel against the Oakland Raiders. The Broncos grabbed the early lead, with quarterback Peyton Manning throwing a 22-yard touchdown pass to tight end Joel Dreessen. The Raiders responded, with a 38-yard field goal by placekicker Sebastian Janikowski, but the Broncos countered, with a 21-yard field goal by placekicker Matt Prater at the end of the first quarter. A 24-yard field goal by Janikowski just before halftime was the only scoring play of the second quarter. The Broncos' offense exploded in the third quarter, with Manning connecting on a 17-yard touchdown pass to wide receiver Eric Decker, followed by a 2-yard touchdown run by running back Willis McGahee and a 14-yard touchdown pass from Manning to running back Lance Ball. Prater added field goals of 43 and 53 yards in the fourth quarter.

Notes

With the win, the Broncos snapped a four-game home losing streak against the Raiders.

Injuries

Center J. D. Walton suffered a dislocated ankle late in the second quarter, and was placed on the season-ending injured reserve the following day (October 1).

Week 5: at New England Patriots

Coming off their dominating win over the Raiders, the Broncos traveled to Foxborough, Massachusetts to face the New England Patriots at Gillette Stadium. This was the 13th meeting between quarterbacks Peyton Manning and Tom Brady since . The Patriots grabbed the early lead, with Brady connecting on an 8-yard touchdown pass to wide receiver Wes Welker. The Broncos responded early in the second quarter, with Manning tossing a 1-yard touchdown pass to tight end Joel Dreessen. However, the Patriots reeled off 24 unanswered points, with running back Shane Vereen rushing for a 1-yard touchdown, a 23-yard field goal by placekicker Stephen Gostkowski just before halftime, followed in the third quarter by Brady scoring a 1-yard touchdown on a quarterback sneak and running back Stevan Ridley rushing for an 8-yard touchdown. The latter touchdown occurred after a Manning fumble deep in Broncos' territory. The Broncos responded, with Manning throwing a pair of touchdown passes – a 2-yarder to wide receiver Eric Decker, followed in the fourth quarter by a 5-yarder to wide receiver Brandon Stokley to close the gap to 31–21 with 6:43 remaining. Following a Patriots' fumble, the Broncos were attempting to rally, however, running back Willis McGahee fumbled the football at the Patriots' 14-yard line with 3:48 remaining, halting the Broncos' rally attempt. The Patriots subsequently ran out the clock.

Week 6: at San Diego Chargers

Hoping to rebound from their loss at New England, the Broncos traveled to Qualcomm Stadium for an AFC West duel with the San Diego Chargers on Monday Night Football. The Chargers jumped out to a 10–0 lead in the first quarter, with a 32-yard field goal by placekicker Nick Novak, followed by a 15-yard touchdown pass from quarterback Philip Rivers to tight end Antonio Gates. Both scores came off Broncos' miscues on special teams—the former occurred after Trindon Holliday muffed a punt return, while the latter occurred after Omar Bolden coughed up the football on a kickoff return. The Broncos were attempting to narrow the Chargers' lead midway through the second quarter, but wide receiver Eric Decker stumbled near the Chargers' 30-yard line when it appeared that he was headed to the end zone for an easy touchdown, after receiving a 55-yard pass from quarterback Peyton Manning. Three plays later, Manning threw an interception that was returned by Chargers' cornerback Quentin Jammer 80 yards for a touchdown. The Chargers increased their lead to 24–0 just before halftime, with Rivers connecting on an 11-yard touchdown pass to Gates.

The Broncos then staged one of the most memorable comebacks in Monday Night Football history. On the opening drive of the second half, Manning led the Broncos on an 8-play, 85-yard drive, culminating with a 29-yard touchdown pass to wide receiver Demaryius Thomas. On the Chargers' next possession, Broncos' defensive end Elvis Dumervil forced a fumble off Rivers, and cornerback Tony Carter scooped up the football and returned it 65 yards for a touchdown. After the Broncos' defense forced a three-and-out, Manning hooked up with Decker on a 7-yard touchdown pass to pull the Broncos within 24–21 early in the fourth quarter. On the Chargers' next possession, Carter picked off Rivers, and four plays later, Manning tossed a 21-yard touchdown pass to wide receiver Brandon Stokley to give the Broncos a 28–24 lead with 9:09 remaining in the fourth quarter. The Chargers were attempting to rally, but Rivers was intercepted by cornerback Chris Harris, Jr. with 6:54 remaining. However, the Broncos were forced to punt seven plays later, giving the Chargers' offense the football with four minutes remaining. The Chargers once again tried to rally, but six plays later, Harris stepped in front of another Rivers' pass, returning an interception 46 yards for a touchdown, sealing the win for the Broncos.

Week 8: vs. New Orleans Saints

Coming off their miraculous comeback in San Diego and subsequent bye week, the Broncos returned home for an interconference duel against the New Orleans Saints. The Broncos grabbed the lead in the first quarter, with running back Willis McGahee rushing for a 1-yard touchdown. On the Broncos' next possession, McGahee committed a fumble, and the Saints responded early in the second quarter, with quarterback Drew Brees throwing his 300th career touchdown pass—a 29-yarder to running back Darren Sproles. On the Saints' next possession, Brees was intercepted by linebacker Wesley Woodyard, and the Broncos dominated the remainder of the game. Quarterback Peyton Manning tossed a 13-yard touchdown pass to wide receiver Eric Decker and placekicker Matt Prater nailed a 33-yard field goal to close out the first half. The Broncos increased their lead in the third quarter, with Manning connecting on a 1-yard touchdown pass to wide receiver Demaryius Thomas, then pulled away in the fourth quarter, with a 2-yard touchdown pass from Manning to Decker and another 33-yard field goal by Prater. The Saints scored a late touchdown, with Brees connecting on an 18-yard pass to wide receiver Jimmy Graham, but the game had already been decided in the Broncos' favor.

Notes

Linebacker Joe Mays suffered a fractured fibula on a kickoff return during the fourth quarter, and was placed on the season-ending injured reserve the following day (October 29). Drew Brees surpassed John Elway for sixth on the NFL's all-time list for touchdown passes. However, Brees' personal record dropped to 0–7 in games played at Denver.

Week 9: at Cincinnati Bengals

Coming off their dominating win over the Saints, the Broncos traveled to Paul Brown Stadium for an AFC duel with the Cincinnati Bengals. A 43-yard field goal by placekicker Matt Prater gave the Broncos an early lead, but the Bengals countered in the second quarter, with a 28-yard field goal by placekicker Mike Nugent. The Broncos responded, with a 13-yard touchdown pass from quarterback Peyton Manning to wide receiver Eric Decker. The Broncos added to their lead, when return specialist Trindon Holliday took the opening kickoff of the second half 105 yards for a touchdown. However, the Bengals would reel off 17 unanswered points, consisting of a 10-yard touchdown pass from quarterback Andy Dalton to wide receiver A. J. Green, a 49-field goal by Nugent followed in the fourth quarter by running back BenJarvus Green-Ellis rushing for a 2-yard touchdown, with the latter two scores coming off Manning interceptions. This gave Cincinnati a 20–17 lead early in the fourth quarter. The Broncos re-claimed the lead on their next possession, with Manning connecting on a 1-yard touchdown pass to tight end Joel Dreessen. Ten plays into the Bengals' next possession, Dalton was intercepted by cornerback Champ Bailey at the Bengals' 46-yard line, and the Broncos subsequently added to their lead eight plays later, with a 4-yard touchdown pass from Manning to Decker. Trailing 31–20 with 3:36 remaining in the fourth quarter, the Bengals tried to rally, with Nugent nailing a 41-yard field goal with 52 seconds remaining, but the Broncos recovered the onside kick in the game's final minute and subsequently ran out the clock.

Notes

Peyton Manning improved his personal record to 8–0 all-time in games against the Bengals.

Week 10: at Carolina Panthers

Hoping to add to a three-game winning streak, the Broncos traveled to Charlotte, North Carolina for an interconference match-up with the Carolina Panthers at Bank of America Stadium. In the first quarter, the Panthers struck first, with quarterback Cam Newton connecting on a 4-yard touchdown pass to tight end Greg Olsen. However, the Broncos would reel off 29 unanswered points and dominate the remainder of the game. Quarterback Peyton Manning threw a 10-yard touchdown pass to wide receiver Brandon Stokley. The Broncos grabbed the lead in the second quarter, with return specialist Trindon Holliday returning a punt 76 yards for a touchdown, followed by a 53-yard field goal by placekicker Matt Prater, then in the third quarter, cornerback Tony Carter returned an interception off Newton 40 yards for a touchdown. Prater added a 27-yard field goal in the fourth quarter, followed by safety Mike Adams sacking Newton in the end zone for a safety. The Panthers responded in the fourth quarter, with a 5-yard touchdown pass from Newton to Olsen, but the Broncos put the game out of reach, with running back Ronnie Hillman rushing for a 5-yard touchdown.

Notes

The Broncos' defense harassed Cam Newton throughout the game, sacking Newton seven times. This was Broncos' head coach John Fox's first visit to Carolina, where he served as head coach of the Panthers from 2002 to 2010.

Week 11: vs. San Diego Chargers

Hoping to add to a four-game winning streak, the Broncos returned home for an AFC West rematch with the San Diego Chargers. The Chargers grabbed the lead in the first quarter, with safety Eric Weddle returning an interception off Broncos' quarterback Peyton Manning 23 yards for a touchdown. The Broncos responded early in the second quarter, with Manning connecting on a 13-yard touchdown pass to wide receiver Demaryius Thomas. On the Chargers' next possession, quarterback Philip Rivers was intercepted by Broncos' safety Jim Leonhard deep in Chargers' territory. However, the Broncos had to settle for a 19-yard field goal by placekicker Matt Prater. On the first play after the two-minute warning, Broncos' linebacker Nate Irving blocked Mike Scifres' punt, and on the next play, Manning threw a 31-yard touchdown pass to wide receiver Brandon Stokley, giving the Broncos a 17–7 lead. The first points of the third quarter came from the Chargers, with linebacker Shaun Phillips sacking Manning in the end zone for a safety. After linebacker Wesley Woodyard recovered a Rivers' fumble deep in Chargers' territory, the Broncos increased their lead, with Manning throwing a 20-yard touchdown pass to wide receiver Eric Decker. However, the Chargers responded late in the third quarter, with Rivers connecting on an 8-yard touchdown pass to wide receiver Danario Alexander. A pair of field goals by Prater in the fourth quarter—from 30 and 32 yards—gave the Broncos a 30–16 lead with 4:14 remaining in the game. The Chargers tried to rally, with a 21-yard touchdown pass from Rivers to Alexander with 1:24 remaining. However, the Broncos' recovered the onside kick, and subsequently ran out the clock.

Notes

With the win, the Broncos earned their first season sweep of the Chargers since 2005, and snapped the Chargers' three-game winning streak in Denver. Nate Irving's block of a Mike Scifres' punt marked the first time since 2007 that the Broncos' special teams blocked a punt. This was the only game during the  season in which the Broncos wore their alternate navy blue jerseys.

Injuries

Running back Willis McGahee suffered a ruptured MCL and compression fracture in his right knee during the second quarter, when his knee was hit by the helmet of Chargers' cornerback Quentin Jammer. On November 21, McGahee was placed on the injured reserve/designated for return list.

Week 12: at Kansas City Chiefs

Hoping to add to a five-game winning streak, the Broncos traveled to Arrowhead Stadium for an AFC West duel with the Kansas City Chiefs. Two field goals by Chiefs' placekicker Ryan Succop—from 34 and 22 yards—game Kansas City a 6–0 lead in the first quarter. The Broncos grabbed the lead just before halftime, with quarterback Peyton Manning throwing a 7-yard touchdown pass to tight end Jacob Tamme. The Chiefs re-claimed the lead in the third quarter, with a 49-yard field goal by Succop, however, the Broncos responded, with Manning connecting on a 30-yard touchdown pass to wide receiver Demaryius Thomas. For the last 4:41 of the third quarter and the first 8:36 of the fourth quarter, each team proceeded to trade punts, until the Broncos' offense got the football with 6:24 remaining in the game. The Broncos drove 68 yards in 12 plays, eating up 6:10 off the clock, culminating with placekicker Matt Prater nailing a 34-yard field goal with only 14 seconds remaining to give the Broncos some breathing room. The Broncos' defense thwarted the Chiefs' last desperation drive. With the hard-fought win, the Broncos matched their win total from 2011.

Week 13: vs. Tampa Bay Buccaneers

Hoping to add to a six-game winning streak, the Broncos returned home for an interconference duel with the Tampa Bay Buccaneers. The Broncos grabbed the early lead, when defensive tackle Mitch Unrein, lining up as a fullback, caught a 1-yard touchdown pass from quarterback Peyton Manning. The Buccaneers responded, with a 31-yard field goal by placekicker Connor Barth, then grabbed the lead at the end of the first quarter, with quarterback Josh Freeman connecting on an 11-yard touchdown pass to tight end Dallas Clark. After a scoreless second quarter, the Broncos re-claimed the lead for good with 21 unanswered points, consisting of two Manning touchdown passes to wide receiver Demaryius Thomas—from 8 and 10 yards, followed by linebacker Von Miller returning an interception off Freeman 26 yards for a touchdown. After a Manning interception late in the third quarter, a 50-yard field goal by Barth to begin the fourth quarter narrowed the gap to 28–13, but the Broncos countered with a 31-yard field goal by placekicker Matt Prater. With 4:37 remaining in the game, the Buccaneers tried to rally, with a 55-yard field goal by Barth, followed by a 5-yard touchdown pass from Freeman to wide receiver Mike Williams with 2:39 remaining. However, the Buccaneers' onside kick attempt was unsuccessful, and the Broncos subsequently ran out the clock.

Notes

With the win, the Broncos exceeded their win total from 2011, and also clinched their second consecutive AFC West division title. This was the 12th division title in the Broncos' franchise history, tying the Oakland Raiders for the all-time lead in AFC West championships since the 1970 AFL–NFL merger. The Broncos also clinched consecutive division titles for the first time since 1986–87.

Week 14: at Oakland Raiders

Hoping to add to a seven-game winning streak, the Broncos traveled to the O.co Coliseum for an AFC West rematch with the Oakland Raiders. The Broncos jumped out to a 13–0 lead, with quarterback Peyton Manning throwing a 6-yard touchdown pass to tight end Joel Dreessen, followed by field goals of 43 and 34 from placekicker Matt Prater, with the latter field goal occurring early in the second quarter. The Raiders got on the scoreboard late in the first half, with quarterback Carson Palmer throwing a 6-yard touchdown pass to running back Darren McFadden. The Broncos added to their lead in the third quarter, with a 20-yard field goal by Prater, a 1-yard touchdown run by running back Knowshon Moreno and a 33-yard field goal by Prater. A 56-yard touchdown pass from Palmer to wide receiver Darrius Heyward-Bey (with a failed two-point conversion attempt) was the only scoring play of the fourth quarter, and the Broncos ran out the final 5:36 of the game.

Notes

With the win, the Broncos earned their first season sweep of the Raiders since 2006, and also swept their division rivals on the road for the third time in four seasons.

Week 15: at Baltimore Ravens

Hoping to add to an eight-game winning streak, the Broncos traveled to M&T Bank Stadium for an AFC duel with the Baltimore Ravens, where the Broncos had never won in four previous regular-season meetings. A 27-yard field goal by Broncos' placekicker Matt Prater was the only scoring play of the first quarter. The Broncos increased their lead in the second quarter, with fullback Jacob Hester rushing for a 1-yard touchdown. The Ravens were threatening to narrow the Broncos' lead just before halftime; however, Broncos' cornerback Chris Harris, Jr. stepped in front of a pass from Ravens' quarterback Joe Flacco, returning an interception 98 yards for a touchdown. The Ravens finally got on the scoreboard in the third quarter, with a 45-yard field goal by placekicker Justin Tucker. However, the Broncos added to their lead, with quarterback Peyton Manning throwing a 51-yard touchdown pass to wide receiver Eric Decker, followed by a 6-yard touchdown run from running back Knowshon Moreno to give the Broncos a commanding 31–3 lead. The Ravens finally got into the end zone early in the fourth quarter, with Flacco connecting on a 31-yard touchdown pass to tight end Dennis Pitta, but the Broncos responded with a 36-yard field goal from Prater. The Ravens added one more score, with a 61-yard touchdown pass from Flacco to Pitta, but the Broncos' lead was too much for the Ravens to overcome.

Notes

This was the Broncos' first-ever, and, to date, their only win in Baltimore.

Week 16: vs. Cleveland Browns

Hoping to add to a nine-game winning streak, the Broncos returned home for an AFC match-up with the Cleveland Browns. On the game's opening drive, quarterback Peyton Manning threw a 22-yard touchdown pass to wide receiver Demaryius Thomas. The Browns got on the scoreboard, with a 27-yard field goal by placekicker Phil Dawson. A 10-yard touchdown pass from Manning to wide receiver Eric Decker was the only scoring play of the second quarter. The Browns narrowed the Broncos' lead early in the third quarter, with a 53-yard field goal by Dawson, but the Broncos would add 17 unanswered points to their lead, with an 8-yard touchdown pass from Manning to Decker, followed in the fourth quarter by a 27-yard field goal by placekicker Matt Prater and a 1-yard touchdown run by fullback Jacob Hester. The Browns finally scored a touchdown midway through the fourth quarter, with quarterback Colt McCoy connecting on a 6-yard pass to wide receiver Greg Little, but the Broncos' lead was too much for the Browns to overcome. Prater added a 41-yard field goal to close out the scoring.

Notes

The Broncos matched their win total from the two previous seasons combined, and also swept the AFC North division. The Broncos won their 10th consecutive game against the Browns, dating back to the 1991 season, and improved their all-time series record against the Browns to 22–5 (including the playoffs).

Week 17: vs. Kansas City Chiefs

Hoping to add to a ten-game winning streak and gain momentum into the playoffs, the Broncos remained at home for an AFC West divisional rematch with the Kansas City Chiefs, in the  regular season finale. The Broncos grabbed the early lead in the first quarter, with running back Knowshon Moreno rushing for a 3-yard touchdown. The Chiefs got on the scoreboard early in the second quarter, with a 23-yard field goal by placekicker Ryan Succop, in what would be the Chiefs' only scoring play of the game. The Broncos later added to their lead, with quarterback Peyton Manning throwing three touchdown passes—two to wide receiver Eric Decker—from 11 and 16 yards, followed in the third quarter by a 13-yarder to wide receiver Demaryius Thomas. The Broncos added another touchdown late in the third quarter, with running back Lance Ball rushing for a 1-yard touchdown. A 42-yard field goal by Broncos' placekicker Matt Prater in the fourth quarter was the last scoring play of the game.

Notes

With the win, the Broncos exceeded their win total from the two previous seasons combined, swept their AFC West division rivals for only the second time in franchise history, and earned their first season sweep of the Chiefs since 2007. The 35-point margin was the Broncos' largest margin of victory over the Chiefs in the 53-year history of this rivalry. The win was also the 100th in John Fox's coaching career (including postseason games). By virtue of the Houston Texans' 28–16 loss to the Indianapolis Colts earlier in the day, the Broncos clinched a first-round bye and homefield advantage throughout the AFC playoffs.

Standings

Division

Conference

Postseason

Schedule

Game summaries

AFC Divisional Playoffs: vs. (4) Baltimore Ravens

Following a first-round bye, the Broncos kicked off the divisional round of the 2012–13 NFL playoffs at home by welcoming the Baltimore Ravens, whom the Broncos defeated in Baltimore four weeks earlier. A 90-yard punt return for a touchdown by return specialist Trindon Holliday gave the Broncos the early lead. However, the Ravens quickly responded, with quarterback Joe Flacco connecting on a 59-yard touchdown pass to wide receiver Torrey Smith, followed by cornerback Corey Graham returning an interception off Broncos' quarterback Peyton Manning 39 yards for a touchdown. The Broncos tied the game, with Manning throwing a 15-yard touchdown pass to wide receiver Brandon Stokley, then re-claimed the lead midway through the second quarter, with Manning connecting on a 14-yard touchdown pass to running back Knowshon Moreno. The Broncos had an opportunity to add to their lead just after the two-minute warning, but placekicker Matt Prater missed a 52-yard field goal, giving the Ravens excellent field goal position with 1:16 remaining until halftime. Three plays later, Flacco connected on another touchdown pass to Smith – this one from 32 yards.

Holliday took the opening kickoff of the second half 104 yards for a touchdown, but after a Manning fumble, the Ravens tied the game late in the third quarter, with running back Ray Rice rushing for a 1-yard touchdown. After each team's offense subsequently went three-and-out, the Broncos marched down the field on a 10-play, 88-yard drive, culminating with Manning throwing a 17-yard touchdown pass to wide receiver Demaryius Thomas midway through the fourth quarter. The Ravens, on their next possession, marched 44 yards in eight plays, but turned the ball over on downs with 3:12 remaining in regulation. The Broncos achieved one first-down with 2:23 remaining, which forced the Ravens to start using the last two of their three remaining timeouts on defense. After the two-minute warning, the Ravens had exhausted all of their team timeouts, however, the Broncos failed to convert a critical third-down run, and were forced to punt, giving the Ravens the football with 1:15 remaining in regulation. Three plays later, and with no timeouts, Flacco launched a 70-yard touchdown pass to wide receiver Jacoby Jones to tie the game at 35 with 31 seconds remaining to force overtime.

The Ravens won the overtime coin toss. Both teams were forced to punt on their first possessions. The Ravens once again were forced to punt on their next possession, and the Broncos' offense got the football with 3:37 remaining in the first overtime. However, seven plays into the Broncos' second overtime possession, Manning was intercepted again by Graham in Broncos' territory, giving the Ravens the football at the Broncos' 45-yard line with 1:01 remaining in the first overtime. Six plays later, Ravens' placekicker Justin Tucker nailed a game-winning 47-yard field early in the second overtime.

Statistics

Team leaders

League rankings

Records and milestones
Numerous individual, franchise and league records and milestones were either tied, reached or broken during the season:

Team
 Week 6: The Broncos' rally from a 24–0 halftime deficit during the team's Week 6 win over the San Diego Chargers tied the largest comeback in Monday Night Football history. The 35 points scored after halftime tied the highest number of points that the Broncos scored in the second half, and also marked the first time in NFL history that a team won a game by double digits after trailing by at least 24 points at halftime.
 Season: The Broncos set a franchise record for scoring 30 or more points in 11 games, which was surpassed during the 2013 season.

Peyton Manning
 Week 1: Became the third quarterback in NFL history to achieve 400 career touchdown passes (joining Dan Marino and Brett Favre), as well as the fastest quarterback to achieve that feat.
 Week 3: Became the NFL's all-time leader in 300-yard passing games.
 Week 8: Set a new personal record for consecutive 300-yard passing games.
 Week 9: Surpassed Dan Marino for the NFL's all-time lead in game-winning drives in the fourth quarter or overtime.
 Week 11: Surpassed Dan Marino for second-place on the NFL's all-time list for touchdown passes.
 Week 12: Surpassed John Elway for second-place on the NFL's all-time list for regular-season wins by a quarterback.
 Week 13: Surpassed Dan Marino for second-place on the NFL's all-time pass completions list and set a franchise record for touchdown passes in a single season, which Manning surpassed in 2013.
 Week 14: Became the second quarterback in NFL history to achieve 5,000 career pass completions (joining Brett Favre), as well as the fastest quarterback to achieve that feat. He also achieved his NFL-record 12th season with at least 10 wins during a regular season.
 Week 17: Set a new single-season franchise record for pass completions; surpassed Brett Favre on the NFL's all-time list for games with three or more touchdown passes and set a new NFL record with a .707 pass completion percentage in games played during the month of December.
 Overall, Manning set new Broncos' single-season franchise records in pass completion percentage (.686), pass completions (400), passer rating (105.9), passing yardage (4,659) and touchdown passes (37), the latter four of which Manning surpassed in 2013. He was also named to the AFC Pro Bowl for the 12th time in his career, the most by a quarterback in NFL history.

Other players
 Britton Colquitt: Set a new single-season franchise record for net punting, with an average of 42.1 net yards per punt. Colquitt surpassed his own record that he previously set during the 2011 season.
 Chris Harris, Jr.: During the team's Week 15 win over the Baltimore Ravens, Harris returned a 98-yard interception for a touchdown, which, at the time, set a new record for the longest interception return in Broncos' franchise history, until Aqib Talib surpassed that record with a 103-yard return in 2017.
 Trindon Holliday:
 Divisional playoffs: 90-yard punt return for a touchdown set a new record for the longest punt return in NFL playoff history, which was also the first punt return for a touchdown in Broncos' postseason history; became the first player in NFL history to return both a punt and a kickoff for a touchdown in a playoff game.
 Von Miller: Set a new Broncos' franchise record for quarterback sacks in a single season, during the team's Week 16 win over the Cleveland Browns. Miller finished the season with 18.5 sacks.
 Mitch Unrein: Became the first defensive lineman in Broncos' franchise history to catch a touchdown pass, during the team's Week 13 win over the Tampa Bay Buccaneers.

Awards and honors

Pro Bowl and All-Pro selections
Seven Broncos were elected to the 2013 Pro Bowl. Cornerback Champ Bailey, quarterback Peyton Manning and linebacker Von Miller were named as starters, while offensive tackle Ryan Clady and defensive end Elvis Dumervil were named as reserves. Guard Zane Beadles and wide receiver Demaryius Thomas were later added to the game as injury replacements. Clady and Miller, however, each withdrew from the game due to injuries.

Clady, Manning and Miller were also voted to the  All-Pro First Team, while Bailey was named to the Second Team.

Other news and notes

 The Broncos switched their primary home jersey color from navy blue to orange. The orange jerseys that served as the team's alternate colored jersey from 2002 to 2011 became the primary home jersey, while the navy blue jerseys that served as the team's primary home jersey from 1997 to 2011 switched to alternate designation. The change was made due to overwhelming popularity with fans, who clamored for the team to return to wearing orange at home, which was the team's predominant home jersey color from 1962 to 1996.
 On April 3, the Broncos, along with each of the other 31 NFL teams, unveiled the team's new uniforms for the 2012 season, with Nike replacing Reebok as the NFL's merchandising dealer. With the exceptions of a few tweaks (including the neckline), the team's uniform designs remained the same as the previous seasons.
 On July 31, former Broncos' wide receiver Ed McCaffrey, who played with the Broncos from 1995 to 2003, was announced as the team's new color commentator alongside play-by-play announcer Dave Logan on the team's radio network, 850 KOA (AM). McCaffrey replaced Brian Griese, the station's color commentator for the previous two seasons, who took on expanded duties with ESPN's college football coverage.
 The Broncos set a new single-season franchise record for home attendance with 613,062 fans, surpassing the previous record of 612,893 that was set in 2007.

Notes

References

External links
 
 The Denver Post – Complete Broncos Coverage
 2012 Season page on Pro Football Reference
 2012 Denver Broncos at ESPN

Denver
Denver Broncos seasons
Denver Broncos
AFC West championship seasons